Lakeside may refer to the following places in the U.S. state of Michigan:

 Lakeside, Berrien County, Michigan
 Lakeside, Genesee County, Michigan
 Lakeside, Macomb County, Michigan